Camiña is a Chilean commune and village in El Tamarugal Province, Tarapacá Region.

Demographics
According to the 2002 census of the National Statistics Institute, Camiña had 1,275 inhabitants (676 men and 599 women), and it is entirely rural. The population fell by 10.3% (147 persons) between the 1992 and 2002 censuses.

Administration
As a commune, Camiña is a third-level administrative division of Chile administered by a municipal council, headed by an alcalde who is directly elected every four years.

Within the electoral divisions of Chile, Camiña is represented in the Chamber of Deputies by Marta Isasi (Ind.) and Hugo Gutiérrez (PC) as part of the 2nd electoral district, which includes the entire Tarapacá Region. The commune is represented in the Senate by José Miguel Insulza (PS, 2018–2026) and José Durana (UDI, 2018–2026) as part of the 1st senatorial constituency (Arica and Parinacota Region and Tarapacá Region).

References

Communes of Chile
Populated places in El Tamarugal Province